William Jennings Bryan Dorn Veterans Affairs Medical Center is a historic hospital complex and national historic district located at Columbia, South Carolina.  The district encompasses 19 contributing buildings and a covered walk. Most of the oldest buildings are two- to three-story brick structures and feature a Georgian Colonial Revival architectural style. The original buildings date to 1932, with additional buildings completed in 1937, 1945, and 1946.  A major expansion occurred in the 1970s. In 1978, President Jimmy Carter named the hospital after U.S. Representative from South Carolina, William Jennings Bryan Dorn. The complex includes the hospital, recreation, dining, and residential buildings.  The complex is operated by the Veterans Health Administration.

It was added to the National Register of Historic Places in 2009.

References

Historic districts on the National Register of Historic Places in South Carolina
Hospital buildings on the National Register of Historic Places in South Carolina
Colonial Revival architecture in South Carolina
Buildings and structures completed in 1932
Buildings and structures in Columbia, South Carolina
National Register of Historic Places in Columbia, South Carolina